Pavol Blažek (born 9 July 1958) is a retired race walker, who represented Czechoslovakia and later Slovakia in the Olympic Games. He was born in Trnava.

International competitions

References

External links 
 
 
 
 
 

1958 births
Living people
Sportspeople from Trnava
Slovak male racewalkers
Czechoslovak male racewalkers
Olympic athletes of Czechoslovakia
Athletes (track and field) at the 1980 Summer Olympics
Athletes (track and field) at the 1988 Summer Olympics
Olympic athletes of Slovakia
Athletes (track and field) at the 1992 Summer Olympics
Athletes (track and field) at the 1996 Summer Olympics
European Athletics Championships medalists
World Athletics Championships athletes for Slovakia
World Athletics Championships athletes for Czechoslovakia
World record setters in athletics (track and field)